The Cane Corso is an Italian breed of mastiff. It is usually kept as a companion dog or guard dog; it may also be used to protect livestock. In the past it was used for hunting large game, and also to herd cattle.

History 

According to the breed standard of the Fédération Cynologique Internationale, the Cane Corso was once distributed throughout much of the Italian peninsula, but in the recent past was found only in Puglia, in southern Italy. After the collapse of the mezzadria system of share-cropping in the 1960s, the dogs became rare. The modern breed derives from selective breeding from about 1980 of a few surviving animals. A breed society, the Società Amatori Cane Corso, was formed in 1983. The breed was recognised by the Ente Nazionale della Cinofilia Italiana in 1994; it was provisionally accepted by the Fédération Cynologique Internationale in 1996, and received full acceptance in 2007. It was recognised by the American Kennel Club of the United States in 2010.

Characteristics 

The Cane Corso is a large dog of molossoid type, and is closely related to the Neapolitan Mastiff. It is well muscled and less bulky than most other mastiff breeds.

The head is large, slightly over one third of the height at the withers in length, with a well-defined stop. The top of the cranium is flat and slightly convergent to the muzzle. The eyes are oval in shape, and set well apart. The iris of the eye should be as dark as possible.

The coat is short, dense and lustrous. It may be black, various shades of grey (lead-grey, light grey or slate-grey) or fawn (dark fawn, light fawn, or stag red), or dark wheaten (''); it may be brindled. Minor white markings on the chest, the feet or the nose are tolerated.

In 2017 a study of 232 Cane Corso dogs from 25 countries found an average life span of 9.3 years, varying with different coat colours. The longest-lived were black brindle dogs (10.3 years) followed by brindle dogs (10.1 years), grey brindle dogs (9.8 years), fawn dogs (9.0 years), black dogs (9.0 years), grey dogs (9.0 years) and dogs of other colours (8.1 years).

Use 

The Cane Corso is usually kept as a companion dog or guard dog; it may also be used to protect livestock. In the past it was used for hunting large game, and also to herd cattle.

It is subject to a working trial: in order to qualify for registration, dogs must show tranquility in the presence of inoffensive strangers, indifference to gunfire, and aggressive defence of the owner against an attacker.

Notes

References 

FCI breeds
Mastiffs
Dog breeds originating in Italy